Mithrodia bradleyi, known as Bradley's sea star,  is a species of sea star.  It was first described to science by Addison Emory Verrill in 1870.  It was named after Frank Howe Bradley, who collected, in Panama, the type specimen described by Verrill.

Description 

Bradley's sea star has five arms that are banded in lighter and darker shades of red or red-brown. The disk is small. The arms are covered with many small bumps and fewer, more prominent spines. The spines are arranged in rows, including a row that runs right along the top of each arm, and typically two more rows that run the length of the arms on either side. The arms are rounded, almost circular in cross-section.

Distribution 
Bradley's sea star lives in the eastern Pacific Ocean from Mexico to Chile, including the Gulf of California. It is also found in the Galapagos Islands. This temperature range is cooler than a typical tropical fish tank, so this sea star is not collected for the aquarium trade.

References 

Mithrodiidae
Animals described in 1870